Grand Narrows (2001 population 15) is a community in the Cape Breton Regional Municipality in Nova Scotia, Canada. The community is the birthplace of the longest serving Premier of Nova Scotia, George Henry Murray. The Barra Strait Marina is here, operated by the Grand Narrows Waterfront Development Society.

Origin of name
The community is named to describe the wide strait or "Grand Narrows" of Bras d'Or Lake, known as the Barra Strait, between it and Iona.

History
Hector McNeil was one of the first to settle here about 1804, followed soon after by others originally from Barra in Scotland. Archibald McDougall was the teacher at the narrows by 1830, and a good school had been provided by 1839. A Postal Way Office was established in 1851.

The community came to prominence during the 1880s after the Intercolonial Railway built its line from the Strait of Canso to Sydney, crossing the Barra Strait between Iona and Grand Narrows with the Grand Narrows Bridge, still in use, which is the longest railway bridge in Nova Scotia. 
Grand Narrows became a major transshipment point between rail and waterborne passengers and cargo. A hotel was constructed and became a popular resting spot, Canada's first prime minister Sir John A. Macdonald was among its guests.

A passenger and vehicle ferry service was operated by the provincial government across the Barra Strait to Iona until the Barra Strait highway bridge was opened in October 1993. There is but one route of travel through Grand Narrows; a gravel road called "Derby Point" which runs along the shoreline for approximately 3 kilometers.  Most of the residences in the tiny community are summer homes for families who are based in industrial Cape Breton.

References

External links
 Central Cape Breton Community Portal

Communities in the Cape Breton Regional Municipality